The spectacled tetraka (Xanthomixis zosterops) is a species of Malagasy warbler in the family Bernieridae.  It is found only in Madagascar.  Its natural habitat is subtropical or tropical moist lowland forests.

References

Malagasy warblers
spectacled tetraka
Taxonomy articles created by Polbot
Fauna of the Madagascar subhumid forests